Lloyd is a suburb of Wagga Wagga, New South Wales, Australia. It is located to the south-west of the city, to the west of Jubilee Park and Holbrook (Mangoplah) Road, and to the south of Red Hill Road. Development of the suburb commenced in the late 1990s and to date there are only residential dwellings present within its confines.

References

Suburbs of Wagga Wagga